Sahagún  can refer to:

Sahagún, Spain, a town and monastery in Léon, Spain. Cradle of the Mudéjar architecture
Sahagún, Córdoba, the second town in population in Córdoba Department, Colombia, also called "The Cultural City of Cordoba"
Ciudad Sahagún, an industrial city in the state of Hidalgo, Mexico.

People
Agustín Rodríguez Sahagún (1932–1991), Spanish politician. Mayor of Madrid from 1989 to 1991
Bernardino de Sahagún (1499–1590), Franciscan scholar and chronicler of Aztec ethnohistory in the Florentine Codex
Saint John of Sahagun
Marta Sahagún, Mexican politician and First Lady 2001–2006